Hengshui University is a university in Hengshui, Hebei province, China, established by the provincial government.

History 

It used to be a two-year normal college, but it was elevated to a four-year comprehensive college or university in 2004 with the permission of the Ministry of Education.

Hengshui University' sporting facilities include a running track, a tennis court, ping-pong tables, basketball courts and badminton.

Hengshui Normal College was known as an example of mid-1980s medium density architecture. However, developments have occurred since mid-2003, including the construction of modern library facilities.

External links
Hengshui University

Universities and colleges in Hebei
Educational institutions established in 2004
Hengshui
2004 establishments in China